Kappa Delta (ΚΔ) is a sorority with 170 collegiate chapters across North America.

Active Chapters

Notes and references

External links
Kappa Delta official site

Kappa Delta
chapters